Jason John Pominville (born November 30, 1982) is a Canadian-American  former professional ice hockey right winger. He played for the Buffalo Sabres and the Minnesota Wild of the National Hockey League (NHL).

Playing career

Amateur
As a youth, Pominville played in the 1995 and 1996 Quebec International Pee-Wee Hockey Tournaments with minor ice hockey teams from Repentigny, Quebec and Rive-Nord.

Pominville played junior hockey for the Shawinigan Cataractes of the Quebec Major Junior Hockey League (QMJHL). In his fourth and final year with Shawinigan, 2001–02, he amassed 121 points in 66 games – seventh in league scoring – and was awarded the Frank J. Selke Memorial Trophy as the league's most gentlemanly player.

Professional

Buffalo Sabres
Pominville was drafted 55th overall in the second round by the Buffalo Sabres in the 2001 NHL Entry Draft. He played for the Sabres' minor league affiliate, the Rochester Americans of the American Hockey League (AHL), until the 2005–06 season, when he earned a roster spot with Buffalo.

To begin the 2005–06 campaign, Pominville had initially been waived by the Sabres. Clearing waivers, he continued to play in the minors until he was called up a few months into the season. He scored his first NHL goal on November 27, 2005 – a powerplay goal against Olaf Kölzig in a 3–2 win against the Washington Capitals. Pominville quickly became an integral part of the Sabres line-up and finished the rest of the season with the Sabres with 18 goals in 57 games. In the 2006 playoffs, he recorded a hat-trick in Game 2 of the first round against the Philadelphia Flyers. Later in the Sabres' playoff run, he scored the series-clinching goal in the second round against the Ottawa Senators – a shorthanded effort in overtime of Game 5. It marked the first time in NHL history that a playoff series was decided by an overtime shorthanded goal. Buffalo announcer Rick Jeanneret marked this occasion with a call that is now famous in Buffalo hockey lore: "Oh, now do you believe? Now do you believe? These guys are good, scary good!" The Sabres had qualified as the fourth seed in the playoffs after failing to qualify the previous three seasons.

After improving to 68 points the following season, Pominville made a name for himself in 2007–08. He scored at nearly a point-per-game with 80 points in 82 games. In the absence of departed co-captains Chris Drury and Daniel Brière from the previous season, the Sabres utilized a rotating captaincy during the 2007–08 season; Pominville was named captain for the months of March and April. At the end of the season, he was nominated for the Lady Byng Memorial Trophy as the league's most sportsmanlike player, along with Pavel Datsyuk and Martin St. Louis; the honour was awarded to Datsyuk.

On September 18, 2008, the Sabres acknowledged Pominville's rise to prominence and signed him to a five-year, $26.5 million contract extension (taking effect in 2009–10). His existing contract saw him make just over $1 million per season.

On October 13, 2010, his consecutive start streak of 335 games was broken because of the concussion he had received from Chicago Blackhawks defensemen Niklas Hjalmarsson (who was suspended two games for the illegal hit) in the previous game on October 11, 2010, when he was checked into the boards head first and then removed from the ice in a stretcher.

On October 6, 2011, in Helsinki, Finland, Pominville was named permanent Sabres captain. He became the 16th full-time captain in Sabres team history.  While captain of the Sabres, he filmed a video for the You Can Play campaign, which aims to reduce homophobia in sport.

With the lockout postponing the beginning of the 2012–13 season, Pominville signed his first European contract on a temporary basis with German club Adler Mannheim of the Deutsche Eishockey Liga on November 30, 2012. Pominville produced 12 points in just seven games for the Eagles before returning to prepare for the Sabres' season opener.

Minnesota Wild
With the Sabres enduring a largely unsuccessful season and with the intentions to revamp the roster, Pominville, along with a 2014 fourth-round pick, were traded to the Minnesota Wild in exchange for Johan Larsson, Matt Hackett, a 2013 first-round pick and 2014 second-round pick on April 3, 2013. With the Wild, Pominville recorded nine points in ten regular season games.

During the 2013–14 season, he scored 30 goals and 30 assists for 60 points to lead the Wild in scoring.

Return to Buffalo
On June 30, 2017, Pominville returned to the Sabres in a trade that sent him, Marco Scandella and a 2018 fourth-round pick to Buffalo in exchange for Tyler Ennis, Marcus Foligno and a 2018 third-round pick.

On November 1, 2018, Pominville played in his 1,000 career NHL game. He recorded a goal in a 4–2 loss to the Ottawa Senators. The next game, following a pregame ceremony by the Sabres to commemorate his milestone, Pominville recorded two goals and an assist in a 9–2 win over the Senators.

The Sabres did not renew Pominville's contract during the 2019 offseason. He spent the year in Buffalo, playing in beer leagues. In a June 2020 interview, it was stated that Pominville's playing career had ended.

Personal life
Pominville is a dual citizen of Canada and the United States. His father, Jean-Marie, is a native of Montreal and his mother, Deborah, is a native of Green Bay, Wisconsin.

Pominville and his wife Kim have two children together. The family resides in East Amherst, New York. They previously resided in Edina, Minnesota during his stint with the Wild.

International play
Because Pominville has dual citizenship, he was eligible to play for either the United States or Canada in international tournaments, and opted to play for Team USA.

Making his international debut, he chose to represent the United States at the 2008 World Championships and scored five points in seven games.

Career statistics

Regular season and playoffs

International

Awards and honours

References

External links

1982 births
Living people
Adler Mannheim players
Anglophone Quebec people
Canadian emigrants to the United States
Buffalo Sabres captains
Buffalo Sabres players
Buffalo Sabres draft picks
Ice hockey people from Quebec
Minnesota Wild players
National Hockey League All-Stars
People from Repentigny, Quebec
Rochester Americans players
Shawinigan Cataractes players
Canadian ice hockey right wingers